Immigration to the People's Republic of China is the international movement of non-Chinese nationals in order to reside permanently in the country. 

In the late 1970s, roughly 300,000 ethnic Chinese immigrated from Vietnam to China. Immigration has increased modestly since the opening up of the country and the liberalisation of the economy, mostly of people moving to the large cities and to Hong Kong. Many of the foreign nationals who immigrate to China are of Chinese ethnic heritage. China has also been the destination of illegal immigration, particularly along the China–North Korea border and in Guangzhou.

Legal immigration and permanent residency
In 2016, China issued 1,576 permanent residency cards. This was more than double what it had issued the previous year, but still roughly 750 times lower than the United States’ 1.2 million at the time.
By 2017, the number of foreigners holding Chinese Permament Residence finally passed the 10,000 mark. More recent concrete numbers are not easily available, but since 2019 China has also been revamping the process for foreigners to apply for the "Chinese Green Card".

Return of Overseas Chinese

The most significant immigration to China has been by the Overseas Chinese, who in the years since 1949 have been offered various enticements to return to their homeland. Several million may have done so since 1949. The largest influx came in 1978–79, when about 160,000 to 250,000 ethnic Chinese refugees fled Vietnam for southern China, as relations between the two countries worsened. Many of these refugees were settled in state farms on Hainan Island.

Illegal immigration

North Koreans

Illegal immigrants from North Korea have moved across the China–North Korea border to seek higher wages and escape repression.

Approximately 1,850 North Koreans fled their country in 2004, but China views them as illegal economic migrants rather than refugees and sends many of them back. This is also due to pressure from North Korea. Many of those who succeed in reaching sanctuary in foreign diplomatic compounds or international schools have been allowed by China to depart for South Korea.

African migrants 

There is a sizeable community of black Africans primarily concentrated in Guangzhou, China. Since the country's late 1990s economic boom, thousands of African traders and businesspeople, predominantly from West Africa, migrated to the city of Guangzhou, creating an "Africatown" in the middle of the southern Chinese metropolis of approximately 10 km2. The primarily male population often set up local businesses and also engage in international trade.

According to official statistics of the PRC government, the number of Africans in Guangzhou has increased by 30-40% each year, and now form the largest black community in Asia. However, as many have overstayed their visas, official figures may be understated. Estimates vary on the number of Africans living in Guangzhou: from 20,000 to over 200,000. This has led to controversies and anger by the local community due to rumors of increasing numbers of crimes, including rape, fraud, robberies, and drug dealing committed by Africans. Huang Shiding of the Guangzhou Institute of Social Sciences estimates the number of permanent residents of foreign nationality (six months and above) to be around 50,000, of which some 20,000 are of African origin.

By 2020, there is an estimated number of 500,000 Africans residing in China, with the majority being in Guangzhou.

Refugees
At the end of 2015, China held 301,622 refugees, all but 600 from Vietnam.

See also
Migration in China
Chinese emigration

References